Bethpage is an unincorporated community in McDonald County, in the U.S. state of Missouri.

History
A post office called Bethpage was established in 1858, and remained in operation until 1910. The community was named after Bethphage, a place in ancient Israel.

References

Unincorporated communities in McDonald County, Missouri
Unincorporated communities in Missouri